Alexeyevka is a rural locality (a settlement) in Volokonovsky District, Belgorod Oblast, Russia. The population was 79 as of 2010. There are 2 streets.

Geography 
Alexeyevka is located 26 km northwest of Volokonovka (the district's administrative centre) by road. Novy is the nearest rural locality.

References 

Rural localities in Volokonovsky District